Briningham is a village and a civil parish  in the English county of Norfolk. The village is 9.9 miles east north east of the town of Fakenham, 13.3 miles west south west of Cromer, 22.3 miles north north west of the city of Norwich, and 124 miles north north east of London.

History
Briningham's name is of Anglo-Saxon origin and derives from the Old English for the village of Bryni's people.

In the Domesday Book, Briningham is listed as consisting of 35 households and belonging to Alan of Brittany and Bishop William of Thetford.

Geography
The civil parish had in 2001 census a population of 122, increasing to 130 at the 2011 census. For the purposes of local government, the parish falls within the district of North Norfolk.

Buildings
The main and oldest buildings are Belle Vue tower, originally thought to have been a mill but now a private house; Rose Cottage, the Grade 2 listed Mission Hall row of houses; the old Methodist chapel, and the Mill Lane houses.

The Old White Horse (parts of which are up to 400 years old, beams and construction running from the rear lounge through to the front dining room are believed to have been a one-room cottage dating back to the 1600s) formally the White Hart was a licensed public house from 1789 until 1961 when it closed it became a family house in 1967

St. Maurice's Church
Briningham's parish church is dedicated to the Roman-Egyptian martyr, Saint Maurice. Briningham's church is unusual for Norfolk due to the fact it's tower is on the south side of the church.

Transport
The nearest railway station is at Sheringham for the Bittern Line which runs between Sheringham, Cromer and Norwich. There is an abandoned railway line which is considered as a footpath, it runs parallel with an old track "the lane" that leads up to "belle vue tower". 

The nearest airport is Norwich International Airport.

Notable people
Peter Whitbread- English actor and screenwriter

War Memorial
Briningham War Memorial takes the form of a brass plaque inside St. Maurice's Church. It bears the following names for the Second World War:
 Captain C. S. Malcolm Brereton (1905-1942), 5th Battalion, Royal Norfolk Regiment
 Pilot-Officer Alfred J. Majury (1919-1942), Royal Air Force
 Petty-Officer Wilfred W. Barrett (1906-1941), HMS Prince of Wales
 Company-Sergeant-Major Noel E. Twiddy (1915-1944), 6th Battalion, Royal Norfolk Regiment
 Guardsman Donald M. Majury (1922-1944), 4th Battalion, Coldstream Guards

Gallery

References

External links

Villages in Norfolk
Civil parishes in Norfolk
North Norfolk